Olympic Arms, Inc. was a manufacturer and marketer of AR-15 and M16 pattern rifles, carbines and pistols. The company manufactured Colt 1911 (M1911) series 70 style pistols under the name "Safari Arms" and the "Whitney" 22 caliber pistol.

History
Olympic Arms, Inc. was founded by Robert C. Schuetz and began as Schuetzen Gun Works (SGW) in 1956, manufacturing barrels in Colorado Springs, Colorado. Prior to that Mr. Schuetz had been partnered in business with well-known gunsmith P.O. Ackley. In 1975 the company moved to Olympia, Washington, and while its business in rifle barrels and barrel blanks thrived, it also began manufacturing complete custom bolt-action rifles.  In 1982, Schuetzen Gun Works began to manufacture AR-15/M16 rifles and components under the trade name of Olympic Arms, Inc, while custom bolt-action rifles continued to be produced under the SGW brand.

Olympic was the first to introduce features now seen as commonplace on AR-15 rifles. It was one of the first companies to produce free floating aluminum hand guards, pistol caliber conversions, and AR-15-based pistols.  Olympic manufactured many AR-15s in calibers other than the standard 5.56×45mm. Olympic was the first in the industry to offer AR-15-style firearms in 9×19mm and .45 ACP, 10mm Auto, 7.62×39mm, and the Winchester Super Short Magnum cartridges.

In late 1987, the company purchased Phoenix, Arizona-based M-S Safari Arms, adding the M1911 pistol to its lineup under the name Safari Arms. By January 2004, all 1911-style products were manufactured in the Olympic Arms facility in Olympia.

In 2002, Olympic Arms revived the 1955 Whitney Wolverine pistol for the .22 Long Rifle cartridge, with a black polymer frame instead of the original Whitney's blue-finished aluminum alloy frame.

In February 2013, Olympic Arms announced that the company would no longer sell its products to New York law enforcement officers or agencies, following the state's passage of an assault weapons ban.
“After more than 40 years of business, it is with great sorrow that we announce that February 28th, 2017 will be the last day of operation for Olympic Arms, Inc,” noted the company on social media, January 26, 2017.  Despite that announcement, they continued to sell parts and fill orders in a limited capacity until 2020, when they finally ceased all operations.

References

External links 
 Olympic Arms Official Web Site
 Olympic Arms Owners Association

Firearm manufacturers of the United States
Companies based in Colorado Springs, Colorado
Companies based in Olympia, Washington
Privately held companies based in Colorado